Józef Bielawski (August 12, 1910 – September 19, 1997) was a Polish Arabist and scholar of Islam.

A graduate of Jagiellonian University, where he studies law as well as oriental languages, in the years 1948 - 1950 he was the cultural attaché of the Polish Embassy in  Turkey. From 1968 he was a professor at the University of Warsaw, where he created the Arab and Islamic studies program. In 1979 he became a member of the Iraqi Academy of Science. He was a founding member of the Polish-Arab Friendship Association. He is also known for his translation of the Qur'an into Polish. He is also the author of many books relating to Islam and Arabian culture.

References

External links
Online Quran Project includes the Qur'an translation of Józef Bielawski.

1910 births
1997 deaths
20th-century translators
Polish Arabists
Burials at Powązki Cemetery
Jagiellonian University alumni
Polish Islamic studies scholars
Quran translators
Academic staff of the University of Warsaw